Orsonwelles graphicus is a species of linyphiid spider endemic to the Big Island of Hawaii. It was described in 1900 by the French naturalist Eugène Simon.

References

Linyphiidae
Spiders of Hawaii
Endemic fauna of Hawaii
Biota of Hawaii (island)
Spiders described in 1900